Bharapar Dufiwali is a village in Kutch District, Gujarat, India. It has a dried river covering one side and Farms covering the other side.

Location
On its north and northwest lies Dhufi, Hamirpar, Tera and karainya, on the east Balapar, while on its southeast is Khanaay and Paat. The total area of Bharapar ( Dhufi wali ) is of 9 square km, of which 2.5 square km is Farms. It has a total population of approximately 875 a.e. 152 Families.

Connectivity
340 km from the Ahmedabad & 95 km from the Bhuj.

Visitors can Reach Bharapar (Dhufiwali) either by Air, Train or Road route.

By Air, take Flight for Bhuj "Shyamji Krishna Varma Airport". various domestic airlines are available connecting Ahmedabad and Bombay.

By Rail, Take a train going up to Ahmedabad, Gandhidham or Bhuj Station.direct trains between Bhuj-Ahmedabad on meter gauge line and for Bombay on the broad gauge line from Gandhidham.

Train Number	Train Name	Train Source	Dep.Time	Train Destination	Arr.Time

6336	GANDHIDHAM EXP	NAGARCOIL JN	13:30	GANDHIDHAM JN.	14:45

6506	GANDHIDHAM EXP	BANGALORE CY JN	21:25	GANDHIDHAM JN.	14:45

1092	PUNE BHUJ EXP	PUNE JN	19:40

References

Villages in Kutch district